The 2019 Beach Volleyball World Championships was held in Hamburg, Germany from 28 June to 7 July 2019.

96 teams (192 players) competed for the title.

Competition schedule

Medal events

Medal table

Medal summary

Men's tournament

Knockout stage bracket

Women's tournament

Knockout stage bracket

References

External links

 
Beach Volleyball World Championships
Beach Volleyball Championships
2019 in German sport
2019 in beach volleyball
Sports competitions in Hamburg
Beach volleyball in Germany
Beach Volleyball World Championships
Beach Volleyball World Championships